Skippy Blair (March 15, 1924 – June 30, 2021) was an American ballroom dancer credited with popularizing "West Coast Swing." Blair was a member of a group that successfully lobbied the State Legislature in 1988 to have West Coast Swing designated as the official State Dance of California. She was also the founder of the Golden State Dance Teachers Association and a co-founder of the World Swing Dance Council.

Blair danced in the 1975 film Queen of the Stardust Ballroom.

In 1994, she was inducted into the National Swing Dance Hall of Fame. Her students include US Open champions Jordan Frisbee and Tatiana Mollmann.

Blair created the Universal Unit System, a complete system of dance notation that allows dancers to "read" a dance much like musicians read music.

Bibliography

References

1924 births
2021 deaths
American ballroom dancers
Dance notators
Dance teachers
American female dancers
West Coast Swing
20th-century American dancers
Dancers from California
20th-century American women
21st-century American women